9th Bengaluru International Film Festival 2017 (BIFFES 2017) was inaugurated by former Chief Minister of Karnataka, Siddaramaiah  on 2 February 2017 in Bengaluru. A total of 240 films from 60 countries including Oscar nominees of the year such as The Salesman by Iranian director Asghar Farhadi and A Man Called Ove by Swedish director Hannes Holm were screened from 2 February to 9  February 2017.

Asian cinema competition

Indian cinema competition

Kannada cinema competition

Kannada Popular Entertainment

Jury Mention Award

FIPRESCI Critics Award

Jury Award for Kannada Cinema

Jury Special Award

References

External links 
  of BIFFes 2017

Bangalore International Film Festival
2017 festivals in Asia
2017 film festivals